Paretroplus lamenabe is a species of cichlid from the lower part of the Mahajamba River and Lake Tseny in northwestern Madagascar. Until its official scientific description in 2008, it was popularly known as the "Giant Lamena". As suggested by this name, it is a relatively large Paretroplus of the lamena group, reaching almost  in length. This relatively elongate Paretroplus is closely related to the smaller P. nourissati and P. tsimoly.

References

lamenabe
Cichlid fish of Africa
Freshwater fish of Madagascar
Fish described in 2008
Taxonomy articles created by Polbot